Telemofila is a genus of long-legged cave spiders that was first described by J. Wunderlich in 1995.  it contains two species, found on Sumatra and New Caledonia: T. pecki and T. samosirensis.

See also
 List of Telemidae species

References

Araneomorphae genera
Spiders of Indonesia
Spiders of Oceania
Telemidae